UKGameshows.com is a website dedicated to British game shows. The site currently provides information on more than 1,500 British game show formats from 1938 to the present day, over 500 mini-biographies of hosts, along with numerous other background articles.

The site hosts over 5,000 articles, including a weekly news and reviews column "Weaver's Week", written by Iain Weaver, which launched in 2001.

History
The UKGameshows.com website was originally called The UK Game Show Page, a small section of game show fan Chris M. Dickson's personal website. This was set up in 1996 as a spin-off from his popular email discussion list, ukgs-l (since succeeded by a Yahoo Groups list). The page consisted of rules sheets for some game shows of the time, as well as "Chris Compares" programme reviews and various links of interest.

From October 1998, game show consultant and puzzle writer David J. Bodycombe co-founded with Dickson a fuller version of the site, using a list compiled by TV fan Jez Rogers as a basis. The site was updated manually using standard FrontPage software.

With the explosion in the popularity of game shows, and rapid increase in the number of British digital TV channels, the site was relaunched using MediaWiki software in 2004 so that volunteer editors could keep the database up-to-date.

Scope
The site covers game shows made in the United Kingdom. Imported programmes are not included unless they have significant UK input, such as the Eurovision Song Contest. The site's definition of "game show" is wide-ranging, taking in such diverse styles as pre-school observation games (e.g. The Shiny Show), traditional quizzes and panel games, reality television, and talent shows such as New Faces and Opportunity Knocks. Regional shows (including those made in languages other than English) are included, though typically in less detail than those broadcast nationwide. The oldest television programme featured is Spelling Bee from 1938, which is believed to be the world's first television game show, and the oldest radio programme featured is What's Wrong With This? from 1925.
Traditionally the site has included only television shows, but this has now changed and a number of the more notable radio shows are included as well.

In August 2009, the Reading University Student Television production Accumulate! was the subject of the site's 3000th article, thereby becoming the first webcast game show to be featured.

UKGameshows Greatest Game Shows
This is their top 100 most popular gameshows based on popularity.

The Adventure Game
Antiques Road Trip
The Apprentice
Are You Smarter Than A 10 Year Old?
Ask the Family
Banzai
Bargain Hunt
Best of Friends
Big Break

Blankety Blank
Blind Date
Blockbusters
Britain's Got Talent
Britain's Worst Driver
Bullseye
Call My Bluff
Catchphrase
Celebrity Squares

The Chase
Coach Trip
Come Dine with Me
Countdown
Crackerjack
The Cube
The Crystal Maze
Dancing on Ice
Deal or no Deal

Dragons' Den
Eggheads
Eurovision Song Contest
Fame Academy
Family Fortunes
Finders Keepers
Fifteen to One
Fort Boyard
Fun House

The Generation Game
Get Your Own Back
Give Us A Clue
Gladiators
Going for Gold
Golden Balls
The Great British Bake Off
Great British Menu
The Golden Shot

I'm A Celebrity... Get Me Out of Here!
In It to Win It
Interceptor
It's a Knockout
Jungle Run
Just a Minute
Knightmare
The Krypton Factor
Love at First Sight

MasterChef
Mastermind
The Million Pound Drop Live
Mr and Mrs
Naked Jungle
Name That Tune
Never Mind the Buzzcocks
Numberwang
1 vs. 100

Play Your Cards Right
Pointless
PokerFace
The Price Is Right
Question of Sport
Raven
Ready Steady Cook
Robot Wars
Runaround

Saturday Night Takeaway
Scrapheap Challenge
Shooting Stars
Stars in Their Eyes
Strictly Come Dancing
Strike It Lucky
Supermarket Sweep
Take Your Pick!
3-2-1

Treasure Hunt
University Challenge
The Weakest Link
What's My Line?
Wheel of Fortune
Who Wants to Be a Millionaire?
Whose Line Is It Anyway?
Wipeout
The X Factor
You Bet!

Polls

All-Time Polls
UKGameshows.com has polled its readers on the subject of the greatest British game shows and game show hosts on a four-year cycle. In 2010, the poll was styled "The Gameshow General Election" and timed to coincide with the real UK general election, with the voting window running from the dissolution of Parliament on 12 April to the close of polls at 10 pm on 6 May.

Poll of the Year
Two further polls were carried out in January 2006 asking readers to select the best and worst new game shows of the previous year. Another poll was added a year later, dubbed "The Golden Fiver", for the best game show of the year overall (not restricted to new formats).

Recognition
UKGameshows.com was one of five websites shortlisted in the "TV" category of Yahoo UK & Ireland's "Finds of the Year 2005" awards.

The website has been cited in UK newspapers including The Guardian and The Times.

In 2006, a screenshot from the site was altered and used in a piece on the satire site BS News which was also widely circulated as a spoof email, in which it was purported to show a contestant named Kathy Evans on the US version of Who Wants to Be a Millionaire? failing to answer a simple $100 question. In fact the screenshot pictured 1999 UK contestant Fiona Wheeler answering a different (and harder) question. Far from failing at the first question, Wheeler won £32,000.

In the 2005 book ITV Cultures, published by the Open University Press, UKGameshows.com is used as a case study in the chapter Who Wants to be a Fan of "Who Wants to be a Millionaire?" by Matt Hills. Hills discusses the site's methodology at length, and uses the site (in particular its entry for Who Wants to be a Millionaire? and the results of its 2002 poll) as an example to support his argument that big money game shows can be appreciated on an aesthetic as well as a commercial level.

References

External links
 UKGameshows.com – current site
 Gameshows.ru — Russian version
 Chris Dickson's original page from 1998 – from archive.org

Television websites
MediaWiki websites
British game shows